Chemical storage is the storage of controlled substances or hazardous materials in chemical stores, chemical storage cabinets, or similar devices. 

Chemical storage devices are usually present where a workplace requires the use of non-hazardous and/or hazardous chemicals. Proper storage is imperative for the safety of, and access by, laboratory workers. Improper chemical storage can result in the creation of workplace safety hazards, including the presence of heat, fire, explosion and leakage of toxic gas.

Chemical storage cabinets are typically used to safely store small amounts of chemical substances within a workplace or laboratory for regular use. These cabinets are typically made from materials that are resistant to the chemicals stored in them and occasionally contain a bunded tray to capture spillage. 

Chemical stores are warehouses commonly used by chemical or pharmaceutical companies to store bulk chemicals. In the US, the storage and handling of potentially hazardous materials must be disclosed to occupants under laws managed by the Occupational Safety and Health Administration (OSHA).

Principles 
Proper labeling is important to ensure that chemicals are not misidentified, which is key to protecting health and safety. For example, organizing chemicals alphabetically is not generally recommended, because it may lead to incompatible chemicals placed near each other, risking a dangerous reaction. 

Instead chemicals should be stored according to their reactivity and other properties. For example, acids and bases are incompatible and should be stored separately, whereas sodium and potassium can be kept together as they are both water-reactive but do not have any added hazard when placed with one another. The United Nations Globally Harmonized System of Classification and Labeling of Chemicals (GHS) is an international system created by the United Nations to classify chemicals. The Safety Data Sheet (SDS) or Material Safety Data sheet (MSDS) identifies and classifies the properties and hazards of chemicals. 

Unnecessary storage of large amounts of chemicals can pose a hazard if the amount exceeds the limits permitted by laboratory guidelines, and is avoided by accredited workplaces and laboratories. Chemicals are usually stored in cool areas, away from direct heat sources, moisture, or light and should be regularly checked for degradation or damage.

Types of facilities 

Due to chemicals' varying properties, many types of facilities are needed. Chemical storage facilities must be adequately maintained to prevent and mitigate their hazards. Accidental spillage or mixing of chemicals can be hazardous.

Shelving 
Shelving must be stable, constructed of a material that is compatible with the chemicals stored on it, and not loaded beyond its rated capacity. It is recommended not to store heavy containers on the highest shelves. Storing chemicals under a sink is not recommended, with the exception of compatible cleaning agents and non-hazardous chemicals.

Cabinetry 
Chemical storage cabinets are usually suited for specific classes of chemicals. Acid cabinets, for example, consist of corrosion-resistant materials and sealing to prevent the leakage of fumes. Some institutions recommend a tray to contain any spillage and regular checks for any sign of corrosion. Flammable solvent cabinets are produced from specialized wood or metal able to resist fire for at least 30 minutes. Corrosive storage cabinets are designed for storing corrosive or oxidizing liquids. They contain a single-piece, leak-proof floor pan to contain spills, must be vented to the fume hood or the lab exhaust system, and their interior is constructed of corrosive-resistant materials. Wooden cabinets provide excellent strength for storing corrosives. Their laminate finish offers a high level of chemical durability.

Desiccation 
Desiccation is a chemical storage technique used to maintain or to regulate humidity, usually to store moisture-sensitive chemicals. Desiccation is generally performed with a desiccator. Several types of desiccators are available, including standard, automatic, gas purge and vacuum desiccators.

Cold storage 
Refrigerators and freezers can be used to store flammable and hazardous chemicals. In most situations, specialized laboratory refrigerators are used to ensure that the flash points of certain chemicals are not reached. For flammable chemicals, explosion-proof equipment must be used because conventional refrigerators have sources of ignition.

Maintenance 
Maintaining the proper condition of chemical storage areas reduces the likelihood of accidents or injuries in the workplace. For example, work areas should always be kept neat and clean and regularly inspected for any hazards such as improperly cleaned residue.

References

Laboratory equipment
Chemical safety